Ælfric III was a medieval Bishop of Elmham.  He was consecrated in 1039 and died between 1042 and 1043.

Notes

References

External links
 

Bishops of Elmham